The Turkish Competition Authority (RK) is the Competition regulator in Turkey. It is a government organization in Republic of Turkey Türkiye [ˈtyɾcije] which prevents any threats to the competitive process in the markets for goods and services through the use of the powers granted by law. Ensuring the fair allocation of resources and increasing social welfare by the protection of the competitive process constitutes the basic foundation of the mission of the Competition Authority.

References

External links
The Turkish Competition Authority – Official website (In English)

Government agencies of Turkey
1994 establishments in Turkey
Organizations based in Ankara
Regulatory and supervisory agencies of Turkey
Competition regulators